John James McCoy is a fictional character in the television drama Law & Order. He was created by Dick Wolf and Michael S. Chernuchin and has been portrayed by Sam Waterston during both the show's original run from 1994 to 2010 and since its return in 2022. He is the longest-tenured character on the show, appearing in 18 seasons.  He has appeared in 382 episodes of Law & Order, four episodes of Law & Order: Special Victims Unit, two episodes of Law & Order: Trial by Jury, two episodes of Homicide: Life on the Street, and the made-for-TV movie Exiled.

Waterston's performance as McCoy on the New York–based series was so popular that it resulted in him being declared a "Living Landmark" by the New York Landmarks Conservancy, along with fellow longtime series cast member Jerry Orbach (who portrayed the popular police detective Lennie Briscoe for almost 12 years).

Character overview
Jack McCoy brings 24 years of experience with him as he is introduced as  Executive Assistant District Attorney by Adam Schiff (Steven Hill) in the season five premiere episode "Second Opinion". He quickly establishes himself as more unconventional and ruthless than his predecessor as Executive Assistant District Attorney, Ben Stone (Michael Moriarty). He often bends—and sometimes breaks—trial rules to get convictions, finds tenuous rationales for charging defendants with crimes when the original charges fail to stick, and charges innocent people to frighten them into testifying against the actual guilty parties. McCoy is found in contempt of court 80 times for such behavior, and his tactics occasionally incur negative publicity for the DA's office. His underlying motivation, however, is not, he maintains, corruption but a sincere desire to see justice done. To that end, McCoy has gone after defendants accused of perverting the justice system to arrange wrongful convictions with just as much determination as his more mundane cases. Such aggressive actions in the courts have earned him the nickname "Hang 'em High McCoy". He describes himself as a "junkyard dog". He is well-respected in the legal community, once referred to as "the top of the legal food chain" by a rival attorney during a trial. 

Following the 17th season (2006–2007), Jack McCoy is appointed interim district attorney, taking over from Arthur Branch (Fred Thompson). McCoy's appearance on Law & Order: Special Victims Unit on the November 13, 2007, episode "Blinded", marked his first appearance in the Law & Order universe as district attorney. The replacement for his former position is Michael Cutter (Linus Roache), a prosecutor with a penchant for recklessness not unlike McCoy's own in his younger days. This occasionally presents political difficulties for the new district attorney. More than once, McCoy berates Cutter for reckless conduct, in the same manner as he was berated by district attorneys when he was executive assistant district attorney.

In the season 19 episode "Lucky Stiff", McCoy begins his election campaign for New York County District Attorney after serving the last season and a half as interim DA. In the season-19 episode "Promote This", in 1991 his wife Ellen (whom he was divorcing) is revealed to have unknowingly employed an undocumented immigrant as a nanny. This causes McCoy political havoc during a murder case where the motive was racism against illegal immigrants of Hispanic descent. In the episode "Skate or Die", the place where his final campaign fundraiser would be held is discovered by the organizers to be owned by a man who served a 20-year prison sentence for racketeering. Eventually, the final campaign fundraiser is held at a Chinese seafood restaurant with a kosher section.

McCoy is hand-picked for the interim DA position by Governor Donald Shalvoy (Tom Everett Scott), and the two initially have a friendly, productive working relationship. By the end of the 18th season, however, McCoy discovers that Shalvoy is involved in a prostitution scandal that is tied to a murder case he is prosecuting. Angered and disappointed, McCoy orders Cutter to start investigating Shalvoy, who retaliates by lending his support to McCoy's opponent in the election. In the last episode of season 19, "The Drowned and the Saved", Cutter uncovers evidence that Shalvoy tried to buy a Senate seat for his wife Rita (Alison Elliott), who ordered the murder, and threatens him with public disgrace unless he resigns. McCoy's opponent suddenly has no patron, giving McCoy good prospects for victory. In the opening episode of season 20,  McCoy is revealed to have won the election; he serves as DA for the remainder of this final season of Law & Order.

Law & Order originally ceased production in 2010, but McCoy (though not seen) was still occasionally mentioned as being the Manhattan DA in the spin-off series Law & Order: Special Victims Unit in several episodes through 2011. A reference to "the new DA" in a 2013 SVU episode would indicate that McCoy had moved on from the position presumably sometime in 2012; his replacement was unnamed. However, McCoy was the DA again as of 2018, showing up in the SVU episode "The Undiscovered Country". As of 2022, he once again appears as the DA in the revival of the original Law & Order, with ADAs Nolan Price (Hugh Dancy) and Samantha Maroun (Odelya Halevi) working under him.

Personal life

It is implied that McCoy lives alone on the West Side of Manhattan.

While he is a brilliant legal mind, McCoy has more than a few personal demons. He was abused by his father, an Irish Chicago policeman who had also beat Jack's mother, and who eventually died of cancer. McCoy says that his determination and unyielding work ethic are a byproduct of having been harshly punished by his father for losing at anything. He also revealed that his father was a racist who once hit him for dating a Polish girl. McCoy disliked his father, calling him a "son-of-a-bitch"; however, he admits he could have easily become like him.

While not a nationalist, he cares enough about his heritage to be offended by a suspect's father's insinuation that two murder suspects committed the crime because of their "Irish temper".

McCoy has been divorced twice (one ex-wife having been a former assistant) and has an adult daughter, Rebecca, with first ex-wife Ellen. One of his ex-wives left him because he worked too many late nights. A gossip columnist writes that McCoy has not seen or spoken to his daughter since 1997, and McCoy receives an envelope containing pictures of his daughter. He does not open the envelope; rather, he places it in his bottom left desk drawer, next to a bottle of Jim Beam. In "Fallout", the last scene shows McCoy meeting his daughter (Jamie Schofield) at a restaurant. In one episode, he mentions Rebecca has taken a job in San Diego, and that she drove up to Los Angeles to meet him there for dinner while he was attending a conference on official business; the governor uses this to try to smear McCoy, wrongly implying that he used public funds to visit Rebecca. In the season-20 episode "Dignity", McCoy mentions to EADA Michael Cutter (Linus Roache) and ADA Connie Rubirosa (Alana de la Garza) that his daughter is either pregnant or a new mother, thus making him soon to be or already a grandfather. He also has a nephew, which indicates that he has at least one sibling. By 2008, his nephew had a young daughter.

McCoy has a reputation for having romantic affairs with his female ADAs. Claire Kincaid (Jill Hennessy) mentions this when they first meet; he tells her he has had affairs with only three of his ADAs, but by the end of the episode, she realizes that he has only had three female ADAs before her. In the episode "Scoundrels", McCoy reveals that defense attorney Sally Bell (Edie Falco) had been one of those ADAs. He at one point was revealed to have had a romantic relationship with his frequent courtroom adversary, defense attorney Vanessa Galiano (Roma Maffia). Kincaid initially makes it clear that she is not interested in a romantic relationship, and McCoy agrees to her stipulation. However, throughout the two seasons in which the two characters appear together, they are implied to be having an affair, with the relationship eventually confirmed in the season 9 episode "Sideshow", long after the Kincaid character had exited the show. Kincaid is killed in a car accident, a source of ongoing pain for McCoy; her death is implied to be the motivation for his legally questionable prosecution of an alcoholic who has killed several people while driving under the influence. Defense attorneys have used his sexual history against him. Since Kincaid's death, McCoy has kept his relationships with assistants professional, albeit friendly.

McCoy's affairs with his ADAs have often had explosive consequences. For instance, his former ADA Diana Hawthorne (Laila Robins), with whom he had a sexual relationship, was found to have suppressed evidence so they could win a case, resulting in an innocent man going to prison. During her trial for intentionally engineering the wrongful convictions, Hawthorne claims that the convictions earned McCoy a promotion he was seeking. Ironically, in the same trial, during which McCoy is forced to admit he was having an affair with Hawthorne, he is being represented by Kincaid, with whom he is presently having an affair.

In "House Counsel", McCoy tries to prosecute a mobster for bribing and murdering a juror. The man's lawyer, Paul Kopell (Ron Leibman), is one of McCoy's oldest friends, with whom he had a competitive relationship for years, and he proves to be equally aggressive in his approach to his work. As Kopell repeatedly stymies McCoy's prosecutorial efforts, McCoy takes the position that Kopell is not acting as an independent attorney, but as a participant in organized crime, and eventually prosecutes Kopell for conspiracy in the juror's murder. He tells Kopell's wife Anna (Jessica Walter) that the prosecution is not personal, but she angrily replies that McCoy simply wants the final victory over a rival. By the end of the episode, though he has won the case, McCoy is so troubled that he does not even want to share an elevator with Kincaid.

While McCoy was not exactly a part of the 1960s counterculture, he did protest against the policies of the Richard Nixon administration, particularly the Vietnam War. In 1972, he published an article in the New York University Law Review in defense of Catholic priests who had been opposed to the conflict. He does retain some of the wild streak from his youth; he is a fan of The Clash and he rides a Yamaha motorcycle. He is opposed to the Iraq War.

Unlike his predecessor Ben Stone (Michael Moriarty), McCoy embraces the option of the death penalty, claiming it is a suitable punishment for particularly heinous crimes and a useful threat in plea bargaining. This often leads to heated arguments with his more liberal colleagues. In "Savages", when the death penalty has just been restored in New York following the election of Governor George Pataki, Kincaid asks McCoy about the probability of executing an innocent individual. McCoy responds that, with the lengthy prosecution process and opportunities for the defendant to appeal the verdict, the probability of wrongful execution is unlikely. Kincaid asks McCoy if he is able to accept the probability of "unlikely"; his hesitation indicates that he has never considered the possibility. In later seasons, his view towards the death penalty has apparently changed: in season 18's "Executioner", he is deeply troubled hearing of a gruesomely botched execution in South Carolina, and in season 20's "Four Cops Shot", he resists efforts by a U.S. attorney to prosecute a suspect in the murder of a police officer under a federal death penalty statute.

He has shown mercy on occasion, such as the 1997 episode "Burned" in which he prosecutes Terence Lawlor (Sam Huntington), a teenage boy with bipolar disorder, for murdering his sister. The boy's grandfather, Carl Anderton (Robert Vaughn), a wealthy CEO (and good friend of Schiff's) who also proved to suffer from the disorder, had attempted to get his grandson to plead guilty and go to jail rather than plead insanity and be committed to a mental institution, fearing that a public revelation of the boy's illness would provide enough evidence to reveal his own. McCoy leads the effort to prevent an unjust punishment for the boy. Similarly, in season seven's "Deadbeat", he declines to prosecute a woman who is the sole caregiver for a boy dying of cancer, although he implies that he may do so once the boy has died.

McCoy was raised Catholic, but does not appear to be in practice, and has not been for some time; he describes himself as a "lapsed Catholic". McCoy was educated by the Jesuits. On several occasions, religion has been the subject of various cases. In the episode "Thrill", in which two teenaged boys are accused of killing a man for fun, McCoy finds his case particularly complicated when one of the suspects confesses the crime to his uncle, a priest. When the confession tape is labeled privileged, McCoy ignores the bishop's request to preserve the sacrament of reconciliation and instead tries to use the tape as evidence. When Detective Rey Curtis (Benjamin Bratt) tries to dissuade McCoy from doing so, reminding him that he is a Catholic, McCoy responds, "Not when I'm at work."

When a man is accused of killing a drug dealer who killed the man's son, a priest (Denis O'Hare) confesses to the crime. Though McCoy personally believes that the priest is covering for the man, he prosecutes the priest, instead. At the end of the episode, McCoy says that he lost his faith after the death of a childhood friend.

Notable conflicts
McCoy's unconventional and sometimes ruthless professional conduct has put his job in jeopardy more than once throughout the series. Some of the more serious occurrences are:
In "Competence" (season five), McCoy withholds from the defense a witness statement indicating that an individual other than the defendant had a motive to commit the crime.  Under Brady v. Maryland, the prosecution is required to turn over exculpatory evidence to the defense.  McCoy's reasoning is that he was not going to call the witness at trial and that he is not obliged to "...turn over irrelevant and potentially misleading evidence."  When the defense eventually learns of the withheld statement and accuses the DA's office of misconduct, DA Adam Schiff (Steven Hill) is angry about McCoy's judgment call, and suggests that McCoy is at grave risk of being disbarred.  At the resulting hearing, a judge declares that McCoy pushed the envelope, but that the ambiguity of the law did not prove his actions were unethical.
 In "Corpus Delicti" (season six), McCoy tries to prosecute a man, first for insurance fraud involving a wealthy widow show horse owner, and then, when the widow disappears, for her murder. When McCoy is unable to prove her murder without her body, he repeatedly questions the defendant as though the fraud against the widow is a fact, and her murder, therefore, must have been the logical consequence, despite the judge's repeated instruction not to do so.  The judge declares a mistrial because of McCoy's repeated refusal to follow the instruction.  When the widow's body is found several months later, McCoy reacts as though he will naturally be able to represent his case. When Schiff recalls that McCoy did want more time to find the widow's body, McCoy responds as though his emotional nature sometimes gets the better of him, but he smiles as though he knows well that "his emotional nature" was a stalling tactic to delay the case until the widow's body was found.
 In "Pro Se" (season six), McCoy defies a direct order from Schiff to remove Kincaid from the prosecution of a murderer with whom she had made a plea bargain for an earlier charge, saying to her privately, "It's my case. I choose who sits in my second chair."
 In "I.D." (season seven), McCoy is jailed for contempt of court after accusing the judge of lacking even "the appearance of impartiality," although the judge is later forced to recuse himself.
 In "Mad Dog" (season seven), McCoy becomes obsessed with proving that a recently paroled serial rapist (Burt Young) is guilty of the rape and murder of a young woman. McCoy pushes the police perilously close to harassment and considers putting the man under false arrest until Schiff decides to put a stop to it. At the end of the episode, the rapist is killed by his daughter after he attacks one of her friends. McCoy says, "I'm sorry it had to happen this way". ADA Jamie Ross (Carey Lowell) replies, "Not that sorry".
 In "Under the Influence" (season eight), McCoy is prosecuting a drunk driver for killing three pedestrians. He takes a statement from a flight attendant (a citizen of Colombia) who had served the defendant large amounts of alcohol and noted how drunk he had become. Encouraged by McCoy, the airline reassigned her to an international route, making her inaccessible to the defense for questioning. McCoy lies to the defense about having followed all relevant discovery procedures, and the presiding judge - who wants to make an example of the defendant in order to further his political ambitions - urges McCoy to withhold the statement as it could bolster the defense's case. Ross warns McCoy that withholding the statement may lead to his disbarment; McCoy eventually changes his mind and submits it, prompting a plea bargain. The judge initially rejects the agreement and threatens to charge McCoy with professional misconduct, but McCoy counters with a threat to file a complaint with the ethics committee over the judge's handling of the case. The judge accepts the plea, and neither he nor McCoy files any charges against the other. Dialogue throughout the episode implies that McCoy sees the defendant as a surrogate for the drunk driver who killed Kincaid.
 In "Monster" (season eight), McCoy is brought before the disciplinary committee of the New York Supreme Court, Appellate Division, on misconduct charges stemming from his conduct in the case of the drunk driver described in "Under the Influence". Since McCoy had ultimately released the evidence before the case was decided, he is not seriously punished for his actions. In the same episode, he had wrongly prosecuted an innocent man for the sexual assault of a young girl; during the investigation, the suspect had been coerced by detectives Lennie Briscoe (Jerry Orbach) and Rey Curtis (Benjamin Bratt) into giving them a false confession. When the real perpetrator is caught, McCoy asks the girl's doctor to give the defendant's lawyer false information. The following episode explains that he is exonerated by the ethics committee.
 In "DWB" (season 9), McCoy, in contradiction of Schiff's direct order, sues to invalidate a federal plea bargain to force a suspect to deal with the New York DA's office.  McCoy assures Schiff that the federal judgment will eventually be overturned on appeal; Schiff retorts that if it is not, he will expect McCoy's resignation.
 In "Refuge, Part II" (season 9), McCoy again disobeys a direct order from Schiff by instructing the police to imprison suspected Russian mobsters without charge.  Near the end of the episode, a suggestion is made that McCoy is ready to resign over this issue, but Schiff simply says, "No martyrs" and allows him to remain in his job.
 In "Invaders" (season 16), after the brutal murder of ADA Alexandra Borgia (Annie Parisse), McCoy pushes the envelope even further when he arranges to present a sham prosecution to intimidate a corrupt Drug Enforcement Administration agent to turn state's evidence against Borgia's murderers. When that trick fails, McCoy, hoping the agent would lead police to the killers, orders him released. While the murderers are arrested and the corrupt agent is killed, the severely unorthodox strategies used in the case lead to McCoy being removed from the case by order of the governor of New York. He is replaced for the duration of the case with an attorney from the New York State Attorney General’s Office.
 In "The Family Hour" (season 17), in which a state senator is on trial for murder, medical examiner Elizabeth Rodgers (Leslie Hendrix) cites incorrect evidence during cross examination and later tells McCoy about it. McCoy wishes to disclose the error to the judge, but Branch decides the error is not exculpatory, and he orders McCoy to keep quiet. When McCoy refuses to cooperate, ADA Connie Rubirosa (Alana de la Garza) gives the trial's closing summation instead of him. Although Rubirosa wins the case, McCoy submits his letter of resignation in protest. Branch appears to dissuade him from resigning and says he would not be "in this chair forever". Although McCoy insists that he is a prosecutor, not a politician, McCoy replaces Branch as the DA immediately thereafter.

In Law & Order: Special Victims Unit
McCoy has appeared in four episodes of Law & Order: Special Victims Unit; however, he is often referred to in the series, and his actions affect the ADAs working with the Special Victims Unit.

As executive assistant district attorney

Season one 
 "Entitled" (onscreen): McCoy makes his first appearance on the series. McCoy, working with his assistant, Abbie Carmichael (Angie Harmon), assists the Special Victims Unit in solving a cold case that Briscoe handled years before with his then-partner, Detective Mike Logan (Chris Noth).

Season two 
 "Baby Killer" (mention): After a murder intertwines with ADA Alexandra Cabot's (Stephanie March) sex-crimes case, Chief Assistant District Attorney Charlie Phillips (Jeffrey DeMunn) hands the murder case to McCoy.

As district attorney

Season 9 
 "Blinded" (onscreen): McCoy had been promoted to district attorney. At the end of this episode, he calls ADA Casey Novak (Diane Neal) to his office and reprimands her after discovering that she had "abused the authority" of his office to arrange for a man with paranoid schizophrenia who had raped and murdered two young girls during a psychotic break to be institutionalized rather than executed. He gives her one more chance to stay on the case, threatening that if she crosses the line again, he will not only fire her, but also have the New York State Bar Association revoke her license to practice law.
 "Cold" (mention): A mistrial is declared in the case Novak was prosecuting. After she violates due process, Novak is informed by Judge Elizabeth Donnelly (Judith Light) that McCoy has declined to refile charges against the defendant, and that Novak is being called before the bar. She is later censured for committing a Brady violation—withholding evidence that was relevant to the defendant's guilt or innocence.

Season 10 
 "Lead" (mention): ADA Kim Greylek (Michaela McManus) is called back to the Justice Department in Washington, DC. McCoy lets her leave immediately, and asks Cabot, who was working in the appeals bureau, to temporarily work with the Special Victims Unit.

Season 11 
 "Unstable" (mention): McCoy sends Executive ADA Sonya Paxton (Christine Lahti) to "clean the house" in the "he-said, she-said unit" due to too many convictions being overturned. However, during the fourth episode of season 11, Paxton is sent to Alcoholics Anonymous after she appears drunk in court.
 "Confidential" (mention): After SVU Detective Elliot Stabler (Chris Meloni) believes he has made a mistake in charging an attorney who violated attorney-client privilege, he asks Cabot to drop the charges. However, Cabot states that it is "too late" and that "McCoy certainly won't let [her] drop the charges". While in court, the defense rests, Cabot has no rebuttal, and then the defense moves for a directed verdict of not guilty. Judge Elizabeth Donnelly (Judith Light), a former Bureau Chief ADA, agrees, despite revealing that, "it's abhorrent to me, that a district attorney would so blatantly use our system of justice as means to a political end." McCoy was initially supposed to appear in the episode.
 "Witness" (mention): Cabot's material witness in a crime is arrested by Immigration and Customs Enforcement and is taken to a detention facility in New Jersey due to known terrorist links. The witness is released from the facility after McCoy calls the U.S. Attorney to have her released.
 "Torch" (onscreen): McCoy transfers ADA Jo Marlowe (Sharon Stone) to SVU. He enlists her to take up a case of two young girls who were killed in a suspicious fire, because "when the DA [McCoy] sees dead little kids, he thinks special victims." McCoy makes his third appearance on SVU, in the squad room, where he pressures Marlowe to take the case to trial. McCoy is brought up again at the end of the episode when Marlowe mentions she needs to give him the bill for the house used in the fire recreation.

Season 12 
 "Wet" (mention): ADA Mikka Von (Paula Patton) is assigned to the Special Victims Unit, as their new permanent ADA. However, in her first case, she sends the defense attorney on vacation  to give the detectives more time to find out who actually committed the murder. Von is told by Captain Don Cragen (Dann Florek), on behalf of McCoy, to pack her bags and move back to Chicago because the "DA doesn't like dirty tricks," to which Stabler responds, "Unless he’s the one that’s doin’ em."
 "Gray" (mention): Paxton returns from her rehabilitation, noting that she is on probation and that she needs to prove to McCoy that she hasn't lost her "winning ways".
 "Reparations" (mention): Novak returns to the Special Victims Unit after three years, and reveals that McCoy's office had rehired her, but she is still on probation and if she loses her first case back, she is "done".
 "Smoked" (mention): After an FBI special agent initially refuses to let his "personal bag man" co-operate with the Special Victims Unit detectives, ADA Sherri West (Francie Swift) pressures him to agree, by threatening to call McCoy and have him speak to the agent's boss.

Season 13 
 "Scorched Earth" (implied): McCoy is out of office by the season-13 premiere as Cutter, by this time the new Special Victims Unit Bureau Chief ADA, comments to Cabot that "the new DA wants the charges dropped" in the case they were trying at the time.

Season 19 
 "The Undiscovered Country" (onscreen): McCoy is back in office as DA.  When ADA Rafael Barba (Raúl Esparza) performs a mercy killing on an infant in a permanent vegetative state, leading to the entire DA's office being in jeopardy, McCoy sends Barba to trial for murder. Barba is found not guilty but quits his job as an ADA. In the same episode, McCoy delivers a eulogy at the funeral of his predecessor as EADA, Ben Stone. He then persuades Stone's son, Chicago Assistant State Attorney (ASA) Peter Stone (Philip Winchester), to take Barba's place as the Special Victims Unit's ADA.

Reception
Entertainment Weekly television critic Ken Tucker has praised Law & Orders creator Dick Wolf for putting McCoy at the center of "some of the best episodes of the immortal series' 19th season."  Tucker elaborates how the character, riding "herd over a couple of stubborn young bucks — assistant DAs Mike Cutter (Linus Roache) and Connie Rubirosa (Alana de la Garza) — McCoy argues, bellows orders, and croaks with outrage when his charges disobey his legal advice."

District attorney's office timeline

Appearances on other TV shows
Homicide: Life on the Street	
Season 6
Episode 5: "Baby, It's You"	
Season 7	
Episode 15: "Sideshow"
Law & Order: Special Victims Unit	
Season 1
Episode 15: "Entitled"
Season 9	
Episode 7: "Blinded"
Season 11
Episode 21: "Torch"
Season 19
Episode 13: "The Undiscovered Country"
Law & Order: Trial by Jury
Episode 1: "The Abominable Showman"
Episode 8: "Skeleton"

Credits

References

Law & Order characters
Fictional American lawyers
Television characters introduced in 1994
Fictional district attorneys
Crossover characters in television
American male characters in television
Fictional victims of domestic abuse
Fictional Irish American people
fr:Jack McCoy
ja:ジャック・マッコイ
pt:Jack McCoy